The men's 60 metres was a track and field athletics event held as part of the Athletics at the 1904 Summer Olympics programme. It was the second and last time the event was held at the Olympics. 12 athletes from 3 nations participated. The competition was held on August 29, 1904. The event was won by Archie Hahn of the United States, with William Hogenson second and Clyde Blair third as the host nation swept the medals. It was the first of three gold medals in the sprints won by Hahn in 1904.

Background
This was the second and last time the event was held; it was held previously only in 1900. The 60 metres would become a staple of indoor athletics, while the outdoor athletics found in the Olympics would have 100 metres as its shortest sprint. None of the runners from 1900 returned. Favorites included 1903 AAU 100 metres champion Archie Hahn, 1904 AAU 100 metres champion Lawson Robertson, 1903 IC4A 100 metres champion Fay Moulton, and 1904 IC4A 100 metres runner-up Nathaniel Cartmell. American George Poage was the first black man to compete in athletics at the Olympics with his appearance in this event's semifinals; he would become the first black man to medal in athletics when he took bronze in both the 200 and 400 metres hurdles.

Canada made its debut in the event. Hungary and the United States each competed for the second time, the only two nations to compete at both 60 metres events.

Records

These were the standing world and Olympic records (in seconds) prior to the 1904 Summer Olympics.

Clyde Blair, William Hogenson, and Archie Hahn repeated the Olympic record of 7.0 seconds.

Competition format

The competition consisted of three rounds: semifinals, a repechage, and a final. The top runner in each of the four semifinals advanced directly to the final. The second-place runner in each semifinal competed in the repechage. The top two men in the repechage also advanced to the final.

Schedule

Results

Semifinals

Top finisher in each heat advanced to the final, second place earned another chance in the repechage.

Semifinal 1

Semifinal 2

Semifinal 3

Semifinal 4

Repechage

Of the four runners in the repechage, the top two moved on to the final.

Final

Results summary

Sources

 

Athletics at the 1904 Summer Olympics
1904